Bulgaria is a country in southeastern Europe situated entirely in the Balkan peninsula. The country is inhabited by 38 reptilian species, which makes reptiles the second least diverse class of vertebrates in the country, after  Bulgaria's amphibians. The list includes four species that have not been recorded in the country since the first half of the 20th century – the loggerhead sea turtle, green sea turtle, aspic viper and meadow viper. There are four turtle and two tortoise species of four families – Cheloniidae, Emydidae, Geoemydidae and Testudinidae; fourteen lizard species of four families – Anguidae, Gekkonidae, Lacertidae and Scincidae; and eighteen snake species of four families – Boidae, Colubridae, Typhlopidae and Viperidae. In addition, in recent years one turtle species, the North American pond slider, has been observed in numerous bodies of water all over the country; it has not reproduced successfully in the country and is not included in the list. The other two extant orders, Crocodilia and Rhynchocephalia, are not represented in Bulgaria.

The foundations of Bulgarian herpetology, or studies of amphibians and reptiles, were laid in the end of the 19th century by the teacher , who published a number of articles on the subject and the 1912 book Herpetologic Fauna of Bulgaria. In the 1930s and 1940s, the zoologist Ivan Buresh and his associate Yordan Tsonkov conducted in-depth research on the diversity and distribution of the amphibian and reptile species in the country. In the second half of the 20th century the leading Bulgarian herpetologist was Dr. Vladimir Beshkov.

Bulgaria provides various habitats for reptiles. The country falls within six terrestrial ecoregions of the Palearctic realm: Balkan mixed forests, Rodope montane mixed forests, Euxine-Colchic deciduous forests, Aegean and Western Turkey sclerophyllous and mixed forests, East European forest steppe, and Pontic–Caspian steppe. Bulgaria has varied topography. From north to south the main geomorphological regions are the Danubian Plain, the Balkan Mountains, the Sub-Balkan valleys, the Rila–Rhodope massif to the south-west, the Upper Thracian Plain and the Strandzha mountains to the south-east. Most of the country is situated within the humid continental climate region, with Alpine climate in the highest mountains and Mediterranean climate in the southernmost regions. The highest diversity of reptiles is recorded in southernmost Bulgaria – the valley of the river Struma, the eastern Rhodope Mountains, the southern reaches of the river Maritsa and Strandzha. Reptiles are also most diverse at low altitudes; 15 species occur below , and only five species are common above .

Status
The worldwide (not specific to Bulgaria) conservation status of species is based on their placement in one of the following categories from the IUCN Red List.

 – Extinct 
 – Critically endangered 
 – Near threatened 
 – Data deficient 
 – Not evaluated

 – Extinct in the wild
 – Endangered
 – Vulnerable
 – Least concern

Most of the reptile species found in Bulgaria have been categorised as least concern or not evaluated. Four species are near-threatened (the European pond turtle, meadow lizard, four-lined snake and Hermann's tortoise), two species have been designated vulnerable (the meadow viper and spur-thighed tortoise) and two species are classified as endangered (the loggerhead sea turtle and green sea turtle).

Order Testudines

Family Cheloniidae 
Cheloniidae are a family of sea turtles with worldwide distribution in all tropical oceans. The family contains seven species in five genera, of which two species have been recorded in the waters off the Bulgarian Black Sea Coast.

Family Emydidae 
Emydidae, also known as pond or march turtles, are a family of fresh water turtles. With the exception of two species, they are only found in the Western Hemisphere. There are close to 50 species in 10 genera, of which one species occurs in Bulgaria.

Family Geoemydidae 
Geoemydidae are one of the largest and most diverse turtle families. They are distributed in North America, northern South America, Europe, northwestern Africa and Asia. The family contains about 70 species in 19 genera, of which one species occurs in Bulgaria.

Family Testudinidae 
Testudinidae, also known as tortoises, are a family of land-dwelling turtles found in North and South America, Europe, Africa and Asia. They are terrestrial and inhabit warm areas ranging from rain forests to deserts. The family contains about 50 species in 11 genera, of which 2 species are found in Bulgaria.

Order Squamata

Suborder Lacertilia

Family Anguidae 
Anguidae are a family of legless lizards distributed in the Northern Hemisphere. The group includes both egg-laying and viviparous species. There are 73 species in 10 genera, of which three species occur in Bulgaria.

Family Gekkonidae 
Gekkonidae are a large family of small to mid-size geckos. They have global distribution with particular diversity in tropical areas. Gekkonidae include 1033 species in 51 genera, of which one species is found in Bulgaria.

Family Lacertidae 
Lacertidae are a family of true lizards or wall lizards native to Europe, Asia and Africa. The European and Mediterranean species inhabit mainly forest and scrub habitats. There are 321 species in 37 genera, of which nine species occur in Bulgaria.

Family Scincidae 
Scincidae are a cosmopolitan family occurring in a variety of habitats worldwide, apart from boreal and polar regions. With 1589 species, of which one is found in Bulgaria, Scincidae are among the most diverse lizard families.

Suborder Serpentes

Family Boidae 
Boidae are a family of nonvenomous snakes found in America, Africa, Europe, Asia, and some Pacific Islands. There are 58 species in 8 genera, of which one species occurs in Bulgaria.

Family Colubridae 
Colubridae are a family of snakes with worldwide distribution found on every continent except Antarctica. There are 844 species in 118 genera, of which 12 species occur in Bulgaria.

Family Typhlopidae 
Typhlopidae are a family of blind snakes found mostly in the tropical regions of Africa, Asia, the Americas, Australia and various islands. There are 381 species in 29 genera, of which one species is native to Bulgaria and Europe.

Family Viperidae 
Viperidae are a family of venomous snakes found worldwide, except in Antarctica, Australia, New Zealand, Ireland, Madagascar, Hawaii and various other isolated islands. They include 329 species in 33 genera, of which four species occur in Bulgaria.

See also

Geography of Bulgaria
List of amphibians of Bulgaria
List of birds of Bulgaria
List of mammals of Bulgaria
List of protected areas of Bulgaria

References

Sources

External links 
 
 
 
 
 
 

Bulgaria
Lists of biota of Bulgaria
Bulgaria
Reptiles